Thirteen Albatrosses (or Falling off a Mountain) is an American novel written by Donald Harington that was published in 2002.

Plot 

First Part: Primary

Vernon Ingledew decides to run for the governor's seat, although he has no political experience, but he is the great-grandson of Jacob Ingledew, who used to be the governor of Arkansas during Reconstruction. Vernon's best friend, Day and Day's wife, Diana, discussed with Don and Kim that they had already expected Vernon to run for the governor's seat.  They exchanged ideas on why he had decided to do it. Vernon is a genius and he has a self-enriching program that he uses to learn new things. He spends one year learning everything there is to know about two subjects starting at the beginning of the alphabet. He learns everything there is to know about art history and astronomy when he starts this “program". Vernon got to “P” and alphabetically after philosophy came politics, so he decides that the best way to learn politics is to become a politician.

Characters 

Vernon Ingledew – running for the governor's seat, atheist, never attended college, lives in sin with his first cousin, Jelena, displays a hysterically cryptic vocabulary.
Jelena Ingledew - Vernon’s first cousin and “living partner”
Day Whittacker – Vernon’s best friend
Diana Whittacker – Day’s wife

Elements 

Extirpate
To pull up by the roots.
To destroy totally; exterminate.
Politics – running for governor

Reception 

“Harington is the greatest writer living in America.  This book resonates…” - Peter Straub

“Wild, weird, and wonderful.”  - KIRKUS

"...uneven and somewhat disappointing..." - Publishers Weekly

References

2002 American novels